Thomas Hobbes (5/15 April 1588 – 4/14 December 1679) was an English philosopher. Hobbes is best known for his 1651 book Leviathan, in which he expounds an influential formulation of social contract theory. In addition to political philosophy, Hobbes contributed to a diverse array of other fields, including history, jurisprudence, geometry, theology, and ethics, as well as philosophy in general. He is considered to be one of the founders of modern political philosophy.

Biography

Early life
Thomas Hobbes was born on 5 April 1588 (Old Style), in Westport, now part of Malmesbury in Wiltshire, England. Having been born prematurely when his mother heard of the coming invasion of the Spanish Armada, Hobbes later reported that "my mother gave birth to twins: myself and fear." Hobbes had a brother, Edmund, about two years older, as well as a sister, Anne.

Although Thomas Hobbes's childhood is unknown to a large extent, as is his mother's name, it is known that Hobbes's father, Thomas Sr., was the vicar of both Charlton and Westport. Hobbes's father was uneducated, according to John Aubrey, Hobbes's biographer, and he "disesteemed learning." Thomas Sr. was involved in a fight with the local clergy outside his church, forcing him to leave London. As a result, the family was left in the care of Thomas Sr.'s older brother, Francis, a wealthy glove manufacturer with no family of his own.

Education 
Hobbes Jr. was educated at Westport church from age four, passed to the Malmesbury school, and then to a private school kept by a young man named Robert Latimer, a graduate of the University of Oxford. Hobbes was a good pupil, and between 1601 and 1602 he went up to Magdalen Hall, the predecessor to Hertford College, Oxford, where he was taught scholastic logic and mathematics. The principal, John Wilkinson, was a Puritan and had some influence on Hobbes. Before going up to Oxford, Hobbes translated Euripides' Medea from Greek into Latin verse.

At university, Thomas Hobbes appears to have followed his own curriculum as he was little attracted by the scholastic learning. Leaving Oxford, Hobbes completed his B.A. degree by incorporation at St John's College, Cambridge, in 1608. He was recommended by Sir James Hussey, his master at Magdalen, as tutor to William, the son of William Cavendish, Baron of Hardwick (and later Earl of Devonshire), and began a lifelong connection with that family. William Cavendish was elevated to the peerage on his father's death in 1626, holding it for two years before his death in 1628. His son, also William, likewise became the 3rd Earl of Devonshire. Hobbes served as a tutor and secretary to both men. The 1st Earl's younger brother, Charles Cavendish, had two sons who were patrons of Hobbes. The elder son, William Cavendish, later 1st Duke of Newcastle, was a leading supporter of Charles I during the civil war personally financing an army for the king, having been governor to the Prince of Wales, Charles James, Duke of Cornwall. It was to this William Cavendish that Hobbes dedicated his Elements of Law.

Hobbes became a companion to the younger William Cavendish and they both took part in a grand tour of Europe between 1610 and 1615. Hobbes was exposed to European scientific and critical methods during the tour, in contrast to the scholastic philosophy that he had learned in Oxford. In Venice, Hobbes made the acquaintance of Fulgenzio Micanzio, an associate of Paolo Sarpi, a Venetian scholar and statesman.

His scholarly efforts at the time were aimed at a careful study of classic Greek and Latin authors, the outcome of which was, in 1628, his great translation of Thucydides' History of the Peloponnesian War,  the first translation of that work into English from a Greek manuscript. It has been argued that three of the discourses in the 1620 publication known as Horae Subsecivae: Observations and Discourses also represent the work of Hobbes from this period.

Although he did associate with literary figures like Ben Jonson and briefly worked as Francis Bacon's amanuensis, translating several of his Essays into Latin, he did not extend his efforts into philosophy until after 1629. In June 1628, his employer Cavendish, then the Earl of Devonshire, died of the plague, and his widow, the countess Christian, dismissed Hobbes.

In Paris (1629–1637)
Hobbes soon (in 1629) found work as a tutor to Gervase Clifton, the son of Sir Gervase Clifton, 1st Baronet, mostly spent in Paris, until November 1630. Thereafter, he again found work with the Cavendish family, tutoring William Cavendish, 3rd Earl of Devonshire, the eldest son of his previous pupil. Over the next seven years, as well as tutoring, he expanded his own knowledge of philosophy, awakening in him curiosity over key philosophic debates. He visited Galileo Galilei in Florence while he was under house arrest upon condemnation, in 1636, and was later a regular debater in philosophic groups in Paris, held together by Marin Mersenne.

Hobbes's first area of study was an interest in the physical doctrine of motion and physical momentum. Despite his interest in this phenomenon, he disdained experimental work as in physics. He went on to conceive the system of thought to the elaboration of which he would devote his life. His scheme was first to work out, in a separate treatise, a systematic doctrine of body, showing how physical phenomena were universally explicable in terms of motion, at least as motion or mechanical action was then understood. He then singled out Man from the realm of Nature and plants. Then, in another treatise, he showed what specific bodily motions were involved in the production of the peculiar phenomena of sensation, knowledge, affections and passions whereby Man came into relation with Man. Finally, he considered, in his crowning treatise, how Men were moved to enter into society, and argued how this must be regulated if people were not to fall back into "brutishness and misery". Thus he proposed to unite the separate phenomena of Body, Man, and the State.

In England (1637–1641) 
Hobbes came back home from Paris, in 1637, to a country riven with discontent, which disrupted him from the orderly execution of his philosophic plan. However, by the end of the Short Parliament in 1640, he had written a short treatise called The Elements of Law, Natural and Politic. It was not published and only circulated as a manuscript among his acquaintances. A pirated version, however, was published about ten years later. Although it seems that much of The Elements of Law was composed before the sitting of the Short Parliament, there are polemical pieces of the work that clearly mark the influences of the rising political crisis. Nevertheless, many (though not all) elements of Hobbes's political thought were unchanged between The Elements of Law and Leviathan, which demonstrates that the events of the English Civil War had little effect on his contractarian methodology. However, the arguments in Leviathan were modified from The Elements of Law when it came to the necessity of consent in creating political obligation: Hobbes wrote in The Elements of Law that Patrimonial kingdoms were not necessarily formed by the consent of the governed, while in Leviathan he argued that they were. This was perhaps a reflection either of Hobbes's thoughts about the engagement controversy or of his reaction to treatises published by Patriarchalists, such as Sir Robert Filmer, between 1640 and 1651.

When in November 1640 the Long Parliament succeeded the Short, Hobbes felt that he was in disfavour due to the circulation of his treatise and fled to Paris. He did not return for 11 years. In Paris, he rejoined the coterie around Mersenne and wrote a critique of the Meditations on First Philosophy of Descartes, which was printed as third among the sets of "Objections" appended, with "Replies" from Descartes, in 1641. A different set of remarks on other works by Descartes succeeded only in ending all correspondence between the two.

Hobbes also extended his own works in a way, working on the third section, De Cive, which was finished in November 1641. Although it was initially only circulated privately, it was well received, and included lines of argumentation that were repeated a decade later in Leviathan. He then returned to hard work on the first two sections of his work and published little except a short treatise on optics (Tractatus opticus), included in the collection of scientific tracts published by Mersenne as Cogitata physico-mathematica in 1644. He built a good reputation in philosophic circles and in 1645 was chosen with Descartes, Gilles de Roberval and others to referee the controversy between John Pell and Longomontanus over the problem of squaring the circle.

Civil War Period (1642–1651)
The English Civil War began in 1642, and when the royalist cause began to decline in mid-1644, many royalists came to Paris and were known to Hobbes. This revitalised Hobbes's political interests, and the De Cive was republished and more widely distributed. The printing began in 1646 by Samuel de Sorbiere through the Elsevier press in Amsterdam with a new preface and some new notes in reply to objections.

In 1647, Hobbes took up a position as mathematical instructor to the young Charles, Prince of Wales, who had come to Paris from Jersey around July. This engagement lasted until 1648 when Charles went to Holland.

The company of the exiled royalists led Hobbes to produce Leviathan, which set forth his theory of civil government in relation to the political crisis resulting from the war. Hobbes compared the State to a monster (leviathan) composed of men, created under pressure of human needs and dissolved by civil strife due to human passions. The work closed with a general "Review and Conclusion", in response to the war, which answered the question: Does a subject have the right to change allegiance when a former sovereign's power to protect is irrevocably lost?

During the years of composing Leviathan, Hobbes remained in or near Paris. In 1647, he suffered a near-fatal illness that disabled him for six months. On recovering, he resumed his literary task and completed it by 1650. Meanwhile, a translation of De Cive was being produced; scholars disagree about whether it was Hobbes who translated it.

In 1650, a pirated edition of The Elements of Law, Natural and Politic was published. It was divided into two small volumes: Human Nature, or the Fundamental Elements of Policie; and De corpore politico, or the Elements of Law, Moral and Politick.

In 1651, the translation of De Cive was published under the title Philosophical Rudiments concerning Government and Society. Also, the printing of the greater work proceeded, and finally appeared in mid-1651, titled Leviathan, or the Matter, Forme, and Power of a Common Wealth, Ecclesiastical and Civil. It had a famous title-page engraving depicting a crowned giant above the waist towering above hills overlooking a landscape, holding a sword and a crozier and made up of tiny human figures. The work had immediate impact. Soon, Hobbes was more lauded and decried than any other thinker of his time. The first effect of its publication was to sever his link with the exiled royalists, who might well have killed him. The secularist spirit of his book greatly angered both Anglicans and French Catholics. Hobbes appealed to the revolutionary English government for protection and fled back to London in winter 1651. After his submission to the Council of State, he was allowed to subside into private life in Fetter Lane.

Later life

In 1658, Hobbes published the final section of his philosophical system, completing the scheme he had planned more than 20 years before. De Homine consisted for the most part of an elaborate theory of vision. The remainder of the treatise dealt cursorily with some of the topics more fully treated in the Human Nature and the Leviathan. In addition to publishing some controversial writings on mathematics, including disciplines like geometry, Hobbes also continued to produce philosophical works.

From the time of the Restoration, he acquired a new prominence; "Hobbism" became a byword for all that respectable society ought to denounce. The young king, Hobbes's former pupil, now Charles II, remembered Hobbes and called him to the court to grant him a pension of £100.

The king was important in protecting Hobbes when, in 1666, the House of Commons introduced a bill against atheism and profaneness. That same year, on 17 October 1666, it was ordered that the committee to which the bill was referred "should be empowered to receive information touching such books as tend to atheism, blasphemy and profaneness... in particular... the book of Mr. Hobbes called the Leviathan." Hobbes was terrified at the prospect of being labelled a heretic, and proceeded to burn some of his compromising papers. At the same time, he examined the actual state of the law of heresy. The results of his investigation were first announced in three short Dialogues added as an Appendix to his Latin translation of Leviathan, published in Amsterdam in 1668. In this appendix, Hobbes aimed to show that, since the High Court of Commission had been put down, there remained no court of heresy at all to which he was amenable, and that nothing could be heresy except opposing the Nicene Creed, which, he maintained, Leviathan did not do.

The only consequence that came of the bill was that Hobbes could never thereafter publish anything in England on subjects relating to human conduct. The 1668 edition of his works was printed in Amsterdam because he could not obtain the censor's licence for its publication in England. Other writings were not made public until after his death, including Behemoth: the History of the Causes of the Civil Wars of England and of the Counsels and Artifices by which they were carried on from the year 1640 to the year 1662. For some time, Hobbes was not even allowed to respond, whatever his enemies tried. Despite this, his reputation abroad was formidable.

Hobbes spent the last four or five years of his life with his patron, William Cavendish, 1st Duke of Devonshire, at the family's Chatsworth House estate. He had been a friend of the family since 1608 when he first tutored an earlier William Cavendish. After Hobbes's death, many of his manuscripts would be found at Chatsworth House.

His final works were an autobiography in Latin verse in 1672, and a translation of four books of the Odyssey into "rugged" English rhymes that in 1673 led to a complete translation of both Iliad and Odyssey in 1675.

Death

In October 1679 Hobbes suffered a bladder disorder, and then a paralytic stroke, from which he died on 4 December 1679, aged 91,
at Hardwick Hall, owned by the Cavendish family.

His last words were said to have been "A great leap in the dark", uttered in his final conscious moments. His body was interred in St John the Baptist's Church, Ault Hucknall, in Derbyshire.

Political theory
Hobbes, influenced by contemporary scientific ideas, had intended for his political theory to be a quasi-geometrical system, in which the conclusions followed inevitably from the premises. The main practical conclusion of Hobbes's political theory is that state or society cannot be secure unless at the disposal of an absolute sovereign. From this follows the view that no individual can hold rights of property against the sovereign, and that the sovereign may therefore take the goods of its subjects without their consent. This particular view owes its significance to it being first developed in the 1630s when Charles I had sought to raise revenues without the consent of Parliament, and therefore of his subjects. Hobbes rejected one of the most famous theses of Aristotle's politics, namely that human beings are naturally suited to life in a polis and do not fully realize their natures until they exercise the role of citizen.

Leviathan

In Leviathan, Hobbes set out his doctrine of the foundation of states and legitimate governments and creating an objective science of morality. Much of the book is occupied with demonstrating the necessity of a strong central authority to avoid the evil of discord and civil war.

Beginning from a mechanistic understanding of human beings and their passions, Hobbes postulates what life would be like without government, a condition which he calls the state of nature. In that state, each person would have a right, or license, to everything in the world. This, Hobbes argues, would lead to a "war of all against all" (bellum omnium contra omnes). The description contains what has been called one of the best-known passages in English philosophy, which describes the natural state humankind would be in, were it not for political community:

In such states, people fear death and lack both the things necessary to commodious living, and the hope of being able to obtain them. So, in order to avoid it, people accede to a social contract and establish a civil society. According to Hobbes, society is a population and a sovereign authority, to whom all individuals in that society cede some right for the sake of protection. Power exercised by this authority cannot be resisted, because the protector's sovereign power derives from individuals' surrendering their own sovereign power for protection. The individuals are thereby the authors of all decisions made by the sovereign, "he that complaineth of injury from his sovereign complaineth that whereof he himself is the author, and therefore ought not to accuse any man but himself, no nor himself of injury because to do injury to one's self is impossible". There is no doctrine of separation of powers in Hobbes's discussion. According to Hobbes, the sovereign must control civil, military, judicial and ecclesiastical powers, even the words.

Opposition

John Bramhall
In 1654 a small treatise, Of Liberty and Necessity, directed at Hobbes, was published by Bishop John Bramhall. Bramhall, a strong Arminian, had met and debated with Hobbes and afterwards wrote down his views and sent them privately to be answered in this form by Hobbes. Hobbes duly replied, but not for publication. However, a French acquaintance took a copy of the reply and published it with "an extravagantly laudatory epistle".  Bramhall countered in 1655, when he printed everything that had passed between them (under the title of A Defence of the True Liberty of Human Actions from Antecedent or Extrinsic Necessity).

In 1656, Hobbes was ready with The Questions concerning Liberty, Necessity and Chance, in which he replied "with astonishing force" to the bishop. As perhaps the first clear exposition of the psychological doctrine of determinism, Hobbes's own two pieces were important in the history of the free-will controversy. The bishop returned to the charge in 1658 with Castigations of Mr Hobbes's Animadversions, and also included a bulky appendix entitled The Catching of Leviathan the Great Whale.

John Wallis

Hobbes opposed the existing academic arrangements, and assailed the system of the original universities in Leviathan. He went on to publish De Corpore, which contained not only tendentious views on mathematics but also an erroneous proof of the squaring of the circle. This all led mathematicians to target him for polemics and sparked John Wallis to become one of his most persistent opponents. From 1655, the publishing date of De Corpore, Hobbes and Wallis continued name-calling and bickering for nearly a quarter century, with Hobbes failing to admit his error to the end of his life. After years of debate, the spat over proving the squaring of the circle gained such notoriety that it has become one of the most infamous feuds in mathematical history.

Religious views

The religious opinions of Hobbes remain controversial as many positions have been attributed to him and range from atheism to Orthodox Christianity. In the Elements of Law, Hobbes provided a cosmological argument for the existence of God, saying that God is "the first cause of all causes".

Hobbes was accused of atheism by several contemporaries; Bramhall accused him of teachings that could lead to atheism. This was an important accusation, and Hobbes himself wrote, in his answer to Bramhall's The Catching of Leviathan, that "atheism, impiety, and the like are words of the greatest defamation possible". Hobbes always defended himself from such accusations. In more recent times also, much has been made of his religious views by scholars such as Richard Tuck and J. G. A. Pocock, but there is still widespread disagreement about the exact significance of Hobbes's unusual views on religion.

As Martinich has pointed out, in Hobbes's time the term "atheist" was often applied to people who believed in God but not in divine providence, or to people who believed in God but also maintained other beliefs that were considered to be inconsistent with such belief or judged incompatible with orthodox Christianity. He says that this "sort of discrepancy has led to many errors in determining who was an atheist in the early modern period". In this extended early modern sense of atheism, Hobbes did take positions that strongly disagreed with church teachings of his time. For example, he argued repeatedly that there are no incorporeal substances, and that all things, including human thoughts, and even God, heaven, and hell are corporeal, matter in motion. He argued that "though Scripture acknowledge spirits, yet doth it nowhere say, that they are incorporeal, meaning thereby without dimensions and quantity". (In this view, Hobbes claimed to be following Tertullian.) Like John Locke, he also stated that true revelation can never disagree with human reason and experience, although he also argued that people should accept revelation and its interpretations for the reason that they should accept the commands of their sovereign, in order to avoid war.

While in Venice on tour, Hobbes made the acquaintance of Fulgenzio Micanzio, a close associate of Paolo Sarpi, who had written against the pretensions of the papacy to temporal power in response to the Interdict of Pope Paul V against Venice, which refused to recognise papal prerogatives. James I had invited both men to England in 1612. Micanzio and Sarpi had argued that God willed human nature, and that human nature indicated the autonomy of the state in temporal affairs. When he returned to England in 1615, William Cavendish maintained correspondence with Micanzio and Sarpi, and Hobbes translated the latter's letters from Italian, which were circulated among the Duke's circle.

Works 
 1602. Latin translation of Euripides' Medea (lost).
 1620. "A Discourse of Tacitus", "A Discourse of Rome", and "A Discourse of Laws." In The Horae Subsecivae: Observation and Discourses.
 1626. "De Mirabilis Pecci, Being the Wonders of the Peak in Darby-shire" (publ. 1636) – a poem on the Seven Wonders of the Peak
 1629. Eight Books of the Peloponnesian Warre, translation with an Introduction of Thucydides, History of the Peloponnesian War
 1630. A Short Tract on First Principles.
 Authorship doubtful, as this work is attributed by important critics to Robert Payne.
 1637. A Briefe of the Art of Rhetorique
 Molesworth edition title: The Whole Art of Rhetoric.
 Authorship probable: While Schuhmann (1998) firmly rejects the attribution of this work to Hobbes, a preponderance of scholarship disagrees with Schuhmann's idiosyncratic assessment. Schuhmann disagrees with historian Quentin Skinner, who would come to agree with Schuhmann.
 1639. Tractatus opticus II (also known as Latin Optical Manuscript)
 1640. Elements of Law, Natural and Politic
 Initially circulated only in handwritten copies; without Hobbes's permission, the first printed edition would be in 1650.
 1641. Objectiones ad Cartesii Meditationes de Prima Philosophia  3rd series of Objections
 1642. Elementorum Philosophiae Sectio Tertia de Cive (Latin, 1st limited ed.).
 1643. De Motu, Loco et Tempore
 First edition (1973) with the title: Thomas White's De Mundo Examined
 1644. Part of the "Praefatio to Mersenni Ballistica." In F. Marini Mersenni minimi Cogitata physico-mathematica. In quibus tam naturae quàm artis effectus admirandi certissimis demonstrationibus explicantur.
 1644. "Opticae, liber septimus" (also known as Tractatus opticus I written in 1640). In Universae geometriae mixtaeque mathematicae synopsis, edited by Marin Mersenne.
 Molesworth edition (OL V, pp. 215–248) title: "Tractatus Opticus"
 1646. A Minute or First Draught of the Optiques
 Molesworth published only the dedication to Cavendish and the conclusion in EW VII, pp. 467–471.
 1646. Of Liberty and Necessity (publ. 1654)
 Published without the permission of Hobbes
 1647. Elementa Philosophica de Cive
 Second expanded edition with a new Preface to the Reader
 1650. Answer to Sir William Davenant's Preface before Gondibert
 1650. Human Nature: or The fundamental Elements of Policie
 Includes first thirteen chapters of The Elements of Law, Natural and Politic
 Published without Hobbes's authorisation
 1650. The Elements of Law, Natural and Politic (pirated ed.)
 Repackaged to include two parts:
 "Human Nature, or the Fundamental Elements of Policie," ch. 14–19 of Elements, Part One (1640)
 "De Corpore Politico", Elements, Part Two (1640)
 1651. Philosophicall Rudiments concerning Government and Society – English translation of De Cive
 1651. Leviathan, or the Matter, Forme, and Power of a Commonwealth, Ecclesiasticall and Civil
 1654. Of Libertie and Necessitie, a Treatise
 1655. De Corpore (in Latin)
 1656. Elements of Philosophy, The First Section, Concerning Body – anonymous English translation of De Corpore
 1656. Six Lessons to the Professor of Mathematics
 1656. The Questions concerning Liberty, Necessity and Chance – reprint of Of Libertie and Necessitie, a Treatise, with the addition of Bramhall's reply and Hobbes's reply to Bramahall's reply.
 1657. Stigmai, or Marks of the Absurd Geometry, Rural Language, Scottish Church Politics, and Barbarisms of John Wallis
 1658. Elementorum Philosophiae Sectio Secunda De Homine
 1660. Examinatio et emendatio mathematicae hodiernae qualis explicatur in libris Johannis Wallisii
 1661. Dialogus physicus, sive De natura aeris
 1662. Problematica Physica
 English translation titled: Seven Philosophical Problems (1682)
 1662. Seven Philosophical Problems, and Two Propositions of Geometry – published posthumously
 1662. Mr. Hobbes Considered in his Loyalty, Religion, Reputation, and Manners. By way of Letter to Dr. Wallis – English autobiography
 1666. De Principis & Ratiocinatione Geometrarum
 1666. A Dialogue between a Philosopher and a Student of the Common Laws of England (publ. 1681)
 1668.  Leviathan – Latin translation
 1668. An answer to a book published by Dr. Bramhall, late bishop of Derry; called the Catching of the leviathan. Together with an historical narration concerning heresie, and the punishment thereof (publ. 1682)
 1671. Three Papers Presented to the Royal Society Against Dr. Wallis. Together with Considerations on Dr. Wallis his Answer to them
 1671. Rosetum Geometricum, sive Propositiones Aliquot Frustra antehac tentatae. Cum Censura brevi Doctrinae Wallisianae de Motu
 1672. Lux Mathematica. Excussa Collisionibus Johannis Wallisii
 1673. English translation of Homer's Iliad and Odyssey
 1674. Principia et Problemata Aliquot Geometrica Antè Desperata, Nunc breviter Explicata & Demonstrata
 1678. Decameron Physiologicum: Or, Ten Dialogues of Natural Philosophy
 1679. Thomae Hobbessii Malmesburiensis Vita. Authore seipso – Latin autobiography
 Translated into English in 1680

Posthumous works 
 1680. An Historical Narration concerning Heresie, And the Punishment thereof
 1681. Behemoth, or The Long Parliament
 Written in 1668, it was unpublished at the request of the King
 First pirated edition: 1679
 1682. Seven Philosophical Problems (English translation of Problematica Physica, 1662)
 1682. A Garden of Geometrical Roses (English translation of Rosetum Geometricum, 1671)
 1682. Some Principles and Problems in Geometry (English translation of Principia et Problemata, 1674)
 1688. Historia Ecclesiastica Carmine Elegiaco Concinnata

Complete editions

Molesworth editions 
Editions compiled by William Molesworth.

Posthumous works not included in the Molesworth editions

Translations in modern English 
 De Corpore, Part I. Computatio Sive Logica. Edited with an Introductory Essay by L C. Hungerland and G. R. Vick. Translation and Commentary by A. Martinich. New York: Abaris Books, 1981.
 Thomas White's De mundo Examined, translation by H. W. Jones, Bradford: Bradford University Press, 1976 (the appendixes of the Latin edition (1973) are not enclosed).

New critical editions of Hobbes's works 
 Clarendon Edition of the Works of Thomas Hobbes, Oxford: Clarendon Press (10 volumes published of 27 planned).
 Traduction des œuvres latines de Hobbes, under the direction of Yves Charles Zarka, Paris: Vrin (5 volumes published of 17 planned).

See also
 
 
 Hobbesian trap
 
 Joseph Butler
 Hobbes's moral and political philosophy
 Leviathan and the Air-Pump

References

Citations

Sources
 

Attribution:

Further reading

General resources
 MacDonald, Hugh & Hargreaves, Mary. Thomas Hobbes, a Bibliography, London: The Bibliographical Society, 1952.
 Hinnant, Charles H. (1980). Thomas Hobbes: A Reference Guide, Boston: G. K. Hall & Co.
 Garcia, Alfred (1986). Thomas Hobbes: bibliographie internationale de 1620 à 1986 , Caen: Centre de Philosophie politique et juridique Université de Caen.

Critical studies
 Brandt, Frithiof (1928). Thomas Hobbes' Mechanical Conception of Nature, Copenhagen: Levin & Munksgaard.
 Jesseph, Douglas M. (1999). Squaring the Circle. The War Between Hobbes and Wallis, Chicago: University of Chicago Press.
 Leijenhorst, Cees (2002). The Mechanisation of Aristotelianism. The Late Aristotelian Setting of Thomas Hobbes' Natural Philosophy, Leiden: Brill.
 Lemetti, Juhana (2011). Historical Dictionary of Hobbes's Philosophy, Lanham: Scarecrow Press.
 Macpherson, C. B. (1962). The Political Theory of Possessive Individualism: Hobbes to Locke, Oxford: Oxford University Press.
 Malcolm, Noel (2002). Aspects of Hobbes, New York: Oxford University Press.
 MacKay-Pritchard, Noah (2019). "Origins of the State of Nature", London
 Malcolm, Noel (2007). Reason of State, Propaganda, and the Thirty Years' War: An Unknown Translation by Thomas Hobbes, New York: Oxford University Press.
 Manent, Pierre (1996). An Intellectual History of Liberalism, Princeton: Princeton University Press.
 Martinich, A. P. (2003) "Thomas Hobbes" in The Dictionary of Literary Biography, Volume 281: British Rhetoricians and Logicians, 1500–1660, Second Series, Detroit: Gale, pp. 130–144.
 Martinich, A. P. (1995). A Hobbes Dictionary, Cambridge: Blackwell.
 Martinich, A. P. (1997).  Thomas Hobbes, New York: St. Martin's Press.
 Martinich, A. P. (1992). The Two Gods of Leviathan: Thomas Hobbes on Religion and Politics, Cambridge: Cambridge University Press.
 Martinich, A. P. (1999). Hobbes: A Biography, Cambridge: Cambridge University Press.
 
 Oakeshott, Michael (1975). Hobbes on Civil Association, Oxford: Basil Blackwell.
 Parkin, Jon, (2007), Taming the Leviathan: The Reception of the Political and Religious Ideas of Thomas Hobbes in England 1640–1700, [Cambridge: Cambridge University Press]
 Pettit, Philip (2008). Made with Words. Hobbes on Language, Mind, and Politics, Princeton: Princeton University Press.
 Robinson, Dave and Groves, Judy (2003). Introducing Political Philosophy, Icon Books. .
 Ross, George MacDonald (2009). Starting with Hobbes, London: Continuum.
 Shapin, Steven and Schaffer, Simon (1995). Leviathan and the Air-Pump. Princeton: Princeton University Press.
 Skinner, Quentin (1996). Reason and Rhetoric in the Philosophy of Hobbes, Cambridge: Cambridge University Press.
 Skinner, Quentin (2002). Visions of Politics. Vol. III: Hobbes and Civil Science, Cambridge: Cambridge University Press
 Skinner, Quentin (2008). Hobbes and Republican Liberty, Cambridge: Cambridge University Press.
 Stomp, Gabriella (ed.) (2008). Thomas Hobbes, Aldershot: Ashgate.
 Strauss, Leo (1936). The Political Philosophy of Hobbes; Its Basis and Its Genesis, Oxford: Clarendon Press.
 Strauss, Leo (1959). "On the Basis of Hobbes's Political Philosophy" in What Is Political Philosophy?, Glencoe, IL: Free Press, chap. 7.
 Tönnies, Ferdinand (1925). Hobbes. Leben und Lehre, Stuttgart: Frommann, 3rd ed.
 Tuck, Richard (1993). Philosophy and Government, 1572–1651, Cambridge: Cambridge University Press.
 Vélez, Fabio (2014). La palabra y la espada:  a vueltas con Hobbes, Madrid: Maia.
 Vieira, Monica Brito (2009). The Elements of Representation in Hobbes, Leiden: Brill Publishers.
 Zagorin, Perez (2009). Hobbes and the Law of Nature, Princeton NJ: Princeton University Press.

External links

 
 
 
 
 
 
 Hobbes Texts English translations by George Mac Donald Ross
 Contains Leviathan, lightly edited for easier reading
 Thomas Hobbes, A minute or first Draught of the Optiques at Digitised Manuscripts
 Clarendon Edition of the Works of Thomas Hobbes
 Richard A. Talaska (ed.), The Hardwick Library and Hobbes's Early Intellectual Development
 Hobbes studies Online edition
 Bulletin Hobbes in the Journal Archives de Philosophie
 Thomas Hobbes at the Stanford Encyclopedia of Philosophy
 Hobbes's Moral and Political Philosophy at the Stanford Encyclopedia of Philosophy
 Hobbes: Methodology at the Internet Encyclopedia of Philosophy
 Hobbes: Moral and Political Philosophy at the Internet Encyclopedia of Philosophy
 A Brief Life of Thomas Hobbes, 1588–1679 by John Aubrey
 A short biography of Thomas Hobbes
 Hobbes at The Philosophy pages
 
 Thomas Hobbes nominated by Steven Pinker for the BBC Radio 4 programme Great Lives.

 
1588 births
1679 deaths
17th-century English writers
17th-century Latin-language writers
17th-century English male writers
17th-century English philosophers
Alumni of Magdalen Hall, Oxford
Atomists
Critics of Christianity
Critics of religions
Critics of the Catholic Church
Empiricists
English expatriates in France
English mathematicians
English physicists
English political philosophers
English social commentators
English theologians
Epistemologists
Materialists
Metaphysicians
Ontologists
Writers from Malmesbury
Philosophers of culture
Philosophers of education
Philosophers of history
Philosophers of language
Philosophers of law
Philosophers of mathematics
Philosophers of mind
Philosophers of religion
Philosophers of science
Political philosophers
Political realists
Rhetoric theorists
Social philosophers
Theorists on Western civilization
Alumni of Magdalen College, Oxford